There are two Grande 'Vingtaines' in Jersey

 Grande Vingtaine (St Clement) in the parish of St Clement
 Grande Vingtaine (St Peter) in the parish of St Peter